The JAC Refine S5 is a Compact CUV that was produced by JAC Motors and positioned above the slightly smaller JAC Refine S3.

Overview
Previewed by the JAC Eagle SII concept on the 2012 Beijing Auto Show and originally launched on the 2012 Guangzhou Auto Show as the JAC Eagle S5, the compact crossover was quickly rebranded to Refine S5 during the facelift shortly after to fit into the later established Refine sub-brand. Pricing of the JAC Eagle S5 ranges from 89,800 yuan to 135,800 yuan, while the pricing of the facelifted Refine S5 ranges from 89,500 yuan to 139,500 yuan.

The JAC Refine S5 is available with two engines including a 1.8 liter turbo engine with 163hp and 253nm mated to a six-speed manual gearbox, and a naturally aspirated 2.0 liter engine with 136hp and 180nm, mated to a 5-speed manual gearbox at launch.

Gallery

References

External links

Official website

Refine S5
Compact sport utility vehicles
Front-wheel-drive vehicles
Cars introduced in 2013
Cars of China